United Families International (UFI) is a United States nonprofit organization founded in 1978 by Susan Roylance. UFI works on an international scale to influence public policy toward "maintaining and strengthening the family". UFI has NGO status with ECOSOC and works to spread their opinion to United Nations (UN) ambassadors and delegates on family related issues. UFI also operates a website, DefendMarriage.org. They are listed by the Southern Poverty Law Center (SPLC) as an anti-gay hate group. but are supported by and in agreement with significant portions of the Christian conservative coalition.

History
United Families International was founded in 1978 by Susan Roylance of Washington state and Jan Clark of South Carolina. The group actively promotes what it believes are "traditional family values" internationally, nationally and locally.

UFI under Roylance was actively involved in promoting "traditional family values" at the Beijing Conference in the mid 1990s. Roylance characterized the conference as a "wakeup call for those who believe the traditional family unit to be an important basic unit of society".

The organization received ECOSOC accreditation and participated in the World Congress of Families II Conference in Switzerland in 1999.
UFI has brought its platform to international organizations, including the UN in 2002, at which it joined more than 300 activists in urging diplomats to "reaffirm marriage and promote sexual abstinence among teen-agers." Sharon Slater, UFI's president at the time asked UN diplomats "to ensure that religions are respected and protected in U.N. documents, insofar as they respect the family and the dignity of the human person".

The Southern Poverty Law Center (SPLC) first designated United Families International as an anti-gay hate group in 2012.

Issues

Political involvement
UFI, considered by some to be part of the Christian right and a Mormon organization, is connected with several politicians in Arizona. Republican U.S. Representative Andy Biggs is the former policy advisor to UFI and his wife Cindy is the secretary and treasurer of the organization. Republican state Representative Cecil Ash and his wife are also affiliated with the organization.

In 2006, UFI contributed $50,000 in support of Arizona Proposition 107, the Protect Marriage Arizona initiative, a proposed same-sex marriage ban that was ultimately defeated.

Homosexuality
In their Guide to Family Issues UFI makes a number of claims about homosexuality, including

"Discrimination on the basis of gender or race is vastly different from discrimination on the basis of sexual practice."
"Pedophilia is widespread among the homosexual community."
"Reputable studies and decades of successful treatment show that homosexual behavior can be changed."
"It is not marriage, but women in marriage, that help to contain and channel the male sexual appetite."
"In fact it is more compassionate to discourage homosexuality than to tolerate it."

See also
 List of organizations designated by the Southern Poverty Law Center as anti-gay hate groups
 Family Watch International

References

External links
 
 Defend Marriage
 UFI Beginnings and History (video)
 UFI blog

Political organizations based in the United States
Anti-abortion organizations in the United States
Organizations established in 1978
Organizations based in Arizona
Non-profit organizations based in the United States
Ex-gay movement
Conservative organizations in the United States
1978 establishments in the United States
Organizations that oppose LGBT rights in the United States